Brankovina is a village in the municipality of Valjevo, Kolubara District in the north of Valjevo about 12 km. According to the census of 2002, there were 573 people (according to the census of 1991, there were 529 inhabitants).

Entire Brankovina area is declared Historic Landmark of Great Importance in 1979. and it is protected by Republic of Serbia.

There are several important cultural monuments:
Church of the Holy Archangels, which was completed in 1830, the endowment of  Archpriest Mateja Nenadović. It is well preserved, and the church keeps a good church treasury in the form of specific museum collection. It consists of church objects, church books and historical documents from the 18th and 19th century.
Ljuba Nenadović Vajat, built in 1826, birth-house of Ljuba Nenadović.
Old School, built in the 1833.

In the immediate vicinity of the church is a group of grave monuments from the 19th century, about twenty of them. Here are buried many members of the family Nenadović, and other prominent  families from Brankovina.	
In the church yard can be seen "Sobrašice", old wooden houses for family gatherings in the church during the holidays. Directly to the church yard, on the other side of the brook, is the former school yard, and in it two old school buildings, with the appropriate museum settings.

Brankovina hosted the well known Serbian poet Desanka Maksimović, who spent her childhood (she was born in the nearby Rabrovica) and completed primary school there. Throughout her life, Desanka remained emotionally attached to Brankovina, and she frequently revisited it and spent her last years there, and was finally buried under a hundred year old oak trees in the Brankovina churchyard, according to her wishes.

See also
 Valjevo
 Historic Landmarks of Great Importance

External links 
 National Museum Valjevo
 Brankovina (www.valjevozavas.net)

References 

Historic Landmarks of Great Importance
Populated places in Kolubara District
Valjevo